Martinja Vas pri Mokronogu is a village immediately north of Mokronog in the Municipality of Mokronog-Trebelno in southeastern Slovenia. The area is part of the historical region of Lower Carniola. The municipality is now included in the Southeast Slovenia Statistical Region.

Name
The name of the settlement was changed from Martinja vas  to Martinja vas pri Mokronogu in 1953. In the 19th century the German name was Martinsdorf.

Church

The local church, built on a slight elevation east of the settlement, is dedicated to Saint Nicholas and belongs to the Parish of Mokronog. It was first mentioned in written documents dating to 1526 and was restyled in the Baroque in the 17th century. The main altar dates to 1877.

References

External links

Martinja Vas pri Mokronogu on Geopedia

Populated places in the Municipality of Mokronog-Trebelno